The 1957 BC Lions finished the season in fourth place in the W.I.F.U. with a 4–11–1 record. 

Before the season, many media sources predicted the Lions to be playoff bound, however, after going through six different quarterbacks and an eight-game losing streak, the Lions finished out of the playoffs yet again.

The biggest appointment during the 1957 season was the hiring of former Montreal Alouette Herb Capozzi as general manager.  Over nine seasons, Capozzi would eventually build the expansion doormats into a powerhouse that would appear in the Grey Cup in 1963 and win it in 1964.

WIFU all-stars were running back By Bailey and Ed Sharkey at both offensive guard and linebacker.

Regular season

Season standings

Season schedule

Offensive leaders

1957 Canadian Football Awards
None

References

BC Lions seasons
1957 Canadian football season by team
1957 in British Columbia